is a Japanese politician of the Liberal Democratic Party, a member of the House of Representatives in the Diet (national legislature). A native of Oe District, Tokushima and graduate of Keio University, he worked at Mitsubishi Corporation from 1993 to 1998. He was elected for the first time in 2000.

References

External links 
  in Japanese.

Members of the House of Representatives (Japan)
Living people
1969 births
Keio University alumni
Liberal Democratic Party (Japan) politicians
21st-century Japanese politicians